Chernihiv City Council administrative-territorial unit in the Chernihiv region of Ukraine; local government body. The administrative center is the city of Chernihiv].

History
On October 15, 1932, a city council was established within the Chernihiv region. On December 22, 1973, two districts were formed as part of the City Council: Desnyansky and Novozavodskaya, by the Decree of the Presidium of the Supreme Soviet of the USSR of December 22, 1973

In 1999, the villages of Chernihiv district Pevtsy and Aleksandrovka, part of the village Novoselovka (Novoselovsky village council) with a total area of 513.4 hectares were included in the Desnyansky district of Chernihiv City Council, Resolution of the Verkhovna Rada of Ukraine Chernihiv region) from July 8, 1999 № 872-14. Also in 1999, 50.7 hectares of the territory of the Soviet-Sloboda village council (Zarechny and Astra microdistricts) and 160.2 hectares of the Shestovitsky village council (airport, west of Shestovitsa) were included in the Novozavodsky district of the Chernihiv City Council.

Geography
The territory of the City Council is an enclave of the Chernihiv region. Chernihiv City Council takes the right bank of the Desna. The western part of the City Council - Novozavodsky district (41.29%), the eastern - Desnyansky (58.71%). Novozavodsky district has two exclaves (on the territory of Chernihiv district): the territory of Zarechny microdistrict and Chernihiv airport (Shestovitsa).

Administration
The head of the council is Vladyslav Atroshenko (since 2015). The head of the council is elected by the citizens for a term of 5 years. The council consists of 42 deputies.

Transport
 Buses 1, 2, 2A, 3, 5, 7, 9, 10, 15, 17, 20, 22, 23, 24, 25, 27, 28, 29, 30, 31, 32, 33, 34, 35, 37 , 38, 39, 42,
 Trolleybuses 1, 2, 3, 4, 5, 6, 9, 10
 Minibuses 33

See also
 Municipal council

References

External links
 Chernihiv City Council

Tourist attractions in Chernihiv
Tourist attractions in Chernihiv Oblast
Buildings and structures in Chernihiv
Tourism in Chernihiv